The Arriflex D-21 is a film-style digital motion picture camera introduced by Arri in 2008 to replace their earlier generation Arriflex D-20.

Overview 
The D-21 uses a Super 35 (4:3 aspect ratio) sized single CMOS sensor and accepts 35 mm film camera lenses (54mm PL mount). It features an optical viewfinder and modular construction.

The D-21 captures images in three general modes:  HD ('HD422 (16:9)' or 'HD444 (16:9)'), Mscope, and Data ('ARRIRAW (16:9)' or 'ARRIRAW (4:3)'). Its sensor is a CMOS chip with a Bayer mask, with dimensions of 2880x2160 pixels.

Similar cameras 
 Arri Alexa
 Panavision Genesis camera
 Red One

References

External links 
 

Film and video technology
Digital movie cameras